Mitromorpha iki is a species of sea snail, a marine gastropod mollusk in the family Mitromorphidae.

Description

Distribution
This marine species was found off Hawaii

References

 Kay, E. Alison. Hawaiian marine shells. Vol. 64. Bishop Museum Press, 1979.
 Severns, M. (2011). Shells of the Hawaiian Islands - The Sea Shells. Conchbooks, Hackenheim. 564 pp.

External links
 

iki
Gastropods described in 1979